Ewa Beach or simply Ewa is a census-designated place (CDP) located in Ewa District and the City & County of Honolulu along the coast of Māmala Bay on the leeward side of Oahu in Hawaii.  As of the 2010 Census, the CDP had a total population of 14,955. The U.S. postal code for Ewa Beach is 96706.

History and etymology 
The word ewa means "stray" in Hawaiian. The name comes from the myth that the gods Kāne and Kanaloa threw a stone to determine the boundaries, but it was lost and later found at Pili o Kahe. Hawaiian settlement on the Ewa Plain dates back at least to the 12th century C.E., at which time kanaka maoli expanded the main channel of Puuloa (Pearl Harbor) before creating fishponds and terraced agricultural fields in the surrounding area. Scholars have recognized Ewa's ancient fishponds as exemplary evidence of Native Hawaiian ingenuity.

Before Ewa Beach became a town, it was first a huge plantation farm. With  of land sublet by Benjamin Dillingham, W.R. Lowrie became the first plantation manager in 1891, when Hawaiʻi was under the rule of Queen Liliʻuokalani.  Ewa Beach is significant for its association with Ewa Sugar Plantation. Throughout the twentieth century, it played a very influential role in Hawaii's culture, economy, and politics.

Along much of the South Shore of Oahu, Ewa is a reference to the direction of Ewa Beach, roughly westwards along the shore. Related terms are "mauka" (towards the mountains, roughly northwards), "makai" (towards the ocean, roughly south), and Diamond Head or Koko Head, roughly eastwards along the shore.

Geography 
Ewa Beach is located at 21°18'56" North, 158°0'26" West. The main thoroughfare is Fort Weaver Road (State Rte. 76) which runs north (away from the coast) past Ewa to Waipahu, connecting there to Farrington Highway (State Rte. 90) and the H-1 freeway.

The total area is 24.06% water, consisting entirely of the Pacific Ocean off the island shore.

The Ewa Beach CDP does not include Ocean Pointe, Ewa Gentry, Iroquois Point, or Ewa Villages, though these are included within the postal service's ZIP code for the area.

Climate

Demographics 

As of the census of 2010, there were 14,955 people, 3,298 households, and 2,891 families residing in the CDP. The racial makeup of the CDP was 8.4% White, 0.7% African American, 0.1% Native American, 50.6% Asian, 12.9% Pacific Islander, 0.7% from other races, and 26.6% from two or more races.  11.1% of the population were Hispanic or Latino of any race.

There were 3,298 households, out of which 50.8% had children under the age of 18 living with them, 62.8% were married couples living together, 17.5% had a female householder with no husband present, and 12.3% were non-families. 8.5% of all households were made up of individuals, and 4.1% had someone living alone who was 65 years of age or older.  The average household size was 4.50 and the average family size was 4.5.

In the CDP the population was spread out, with 26.3% under the age of 18, 10.0% from 18 to 24, 24.1% from 25 to 44, 24.9% from 45 to 64, and 14.7% who were 65 years of age or older.  The median age was 36.4 years.  For every 100 females there were 97.9 males.  For every 100 females age 18 and over, there were 96.1 males.

As of the 2000 census, the median income for a household in the CDP was $57,073, and the median income for a family was $58,104. Males had a median income of $29,512 versus $23,839 for females. The per capita income for the CDP was $14,807.  9.9% of the population and 8.5% of families were below the poverty line.  Out of the total population, 12.4% of those under the age of 18 and 6.5% of those 65 and older were living below the poverty line.

Government and infrastructure 
The United States Postal Service operates the Ewa Beach Post Office in Ewa Beach.  The Pacific Tsunami Warning Center is also headquartered here.

Education 
Ewa Beach is served by the Hawai'i Department of Education.

Elementary schools in the 'Ewa Beach CDP include Ewa Beach, Kaimiloa, and Pohakea. Ilima Intermediate School, and James Campbell High School are in 'Ewa Beach CDP.

Schools nearby but outside the CDP include Iroquois Point Elementary School (near but not in the Iroquois Point CDP),  Holomua Elementary School, Keone'ula Elementary and 'Ewa Makai Middle.

The Hawaii State Public Library System operates the Ewa Beach Public & School Library. Established on the property of Campbell High on August 28, 1971, it is a dual purpose school library and community library.

Little League World Series 
In 2005, the team from Ewa Beach, representing (locally) West Oahu and the United States, captured the Little League World Series crown, beating Curaçao 7–6 in an extra inning after a walk-off home run by Michael Memea.

Notable people
Bretman Rock (born 1998), social media personality
Tua Tagovailoa (born 1998), American football quarterback for the Miami Dolphins
Taulia Tagovailoa (born 2000), American football quarterback for the Maryland Terrapins

References 

Census-designated places in Honolulu County, Hawaii
Beaches of Oahu
Populated coastal places in Hawaii